Gísli Halldórsson (2 February 1927 – 27 July 1998) was an Icelandic actor of theatre, radio, film and television, and one of the most popular Icelandic actors of the late twentieth century.  He is known internationally for playing the lead role in Children of Nature, which was nominated for an Academy Award as best foreign language film in 1992.

He died of heart failure on July 18, 2021, during a concert by Bratislava Hot Serenaders at the Štúdio L+S theater in Bratislava.

Selected filmography 
 Dansinn (1998, posthumous release)
 Djöflaeyjan (1996)
 Sigla himinfley (1994)
 Á köldum klaka (1995)
 Skýjahöllin (1994)
 Tveir á báti (1992)
 Karlakórinn Hekla (1992)
 Ingaló (1992)
 Children of Nature (1991)
 Áramótaskaup 1991
 Kristnihald undir jökli (1989)
 Áramótaskaup 1987
 Áramótaskaup 1986
 Jón Oddur & Jón Bjarni (1981) – Kormákur afi

External links

References

Halldórsson, Gísli
Halldórsson, Gísli
Icelandic male film actors
Icelandic male television actors
20th-century Icelandic male actors